The Living Forest is a 2001 Spanish 3D computer-animated fantasy film directed by Ángel de la Cruz and Manolo Gómez, based on the novel of the same name by popular Spanish writer Wenceslao Fernández Flórez, with a script by Gómez. The film was released in Spain on 3 August 2001 by Buena Vista International. It won Best Animated Film at the 16th Goya Awards in 2001 and the White Camel award at the Sahara International Film Festival in 2003.

References

External links

2001 films
2001 3D films
2001 fantasy films
2001 computer-animated films
2000s children's fantasy films
2000s children's animated films
2000s Spanish-language films
Spanish 3D films
Spanish computer-animated films
Spanish children's films
Spanish animated fantasy films
3D animated films
Animated films based on children's books
Films based on Spanish novels
Animated films based on novels
Films about trees
Films set in forests
2000s Spanish films